Thomas Johnes  (died c. 1734) of Llanfair Clydogau, Cardiganshire and Dolau Cothi, Carmarthenshire, was a Welsh Whig politician who sat in the House of Commons from  1713 to 1715.
 
Johnes was the only surviving  son of Thomas Johnes of Llanfair, Cardiganshire, and his wife Anne Lloyd, daughter of  David Lloyd of Crymlyn, Monmouthshire. He succeeded to his father's estates in about 1698. He married Jane Herbert, daughter of William Herbert of Hafod Uchdryd, Llanfihangel-y-Creuddyn, Cardiganshire and then as his second wife, Blanche Van, daughter of David Van of Llanwern, Monmouthshire.
 
Johnes was High Sheriff of Cardiganshire for the year 1704 to 1705. At the 1713 general election he was returned as Member of Parliament for Cardiganshire, but lost the seat in 1715.

Johnes died in 1734 without issue by either wife and nominated as his heir Thomas Johnes of Pen-y-bont, Radnorshire, a first cousin once removed.

References

1730s deaths
Year of birth missing
Members of the Parliament of Great Britain for Welsh constituencies
British MPs 1713–1715
High Sheriffs of Cardiganshire